Davor Jorge Gjuranovic Letelier (1986) is a Chilean journalist commonly known for his spell at Televisión Nacional de Chile. Similarly, he is regarded for having reported Augusto Pinochet's death in December 2006 as well as his coverage to the Military Parades since 2010.

References

External Links
 

1981 births
Living people
Chilean people
Pontifical Catholic University of Valparaíso alumni
Adolfo Ibáñez University alumni
Georgetown University alumni